Nigina Abduraimova and Barbora Štefková were the defending champions, but both players chose not to participate.

Veronika Kudermetova and İpek Soylu won the title, defeating Ksenia Lykina and Polina Monova in the final, 4–6, 7–5, [11–9].

Seeds

Draw

References
Main Draw

Lale Cup - Doubles
Lale Cup
Lale Cup
Lale Cup